The Sphinx, founded in 1885, is the oldest of the fourteen official senior societies at Dartmouth College in Hanover, New Hampshire.

History

The Sphinx was founded as a senior class society in 1885 by 14 male students of the class of 1886.

The senior members of the Sphinx continue to select a small number of male students of the junior class during Winter Carnival Weekend in a process known as "tapping."   Traditionally selecting 24 members per year, the delegation often is referred to as "twenty-fours." The Sphinx originally published the names of its members in the annual Aegis, but the society has become more secretive in recent years. The identities of the members are now kept secret until Commencement, when graduating members carry identifying canes.

The Sphinx Tomb, constructed in 1903 on East Wheelock Street, was designed by Manchester architect William M. Butterfield and reflects the Egyptian Revival architectural style popular during the mid-nineteenth century. In 1923, a significant addition was planned for the tomb; however, the proposed addition was never constructed. Instead, a smaller rear addition was constructed in 1926. The interior of the Sphinx was replaced after a fire started in the building's furnace destroyed it in 1929. The building was listed on the National Register of Historic Places in 2005.

Many rumors surround the Sphinx.  Some have believed that the tomb routinely has the highest water bill of any building in town because it contains a swimming pool.  Another rumor is that a passageway connects the Sphinx to the basement of Alpha Delta fraternity next door.  The group's clandestine operations are rumored to include everything from providing anonymous community service to long ago stealing artwork from the College in a traditional scavenger hunt.

The Sphinx attracted negative publicity in 1989, when thefts that took place during a scavenger hunt were traced back to the secret society. On April 27, 1989, 16 students took part in a scavenger hunt that resulted in the theft of numerous items across the Dartmouth campus, including paintings, photographs, mailboxes, life preservers, and signs. The school estimated the total value of missing items at nearly $12,000. The school demanded that all items be returned undamaged within 24 hours, in which case it would not investigate further. Most items were returned but as several were still missing, an investigation was launched, which revealed that the Sphinx was responsible for the scavenger hunt. Dartmouth revoked recognition of the Sphinx for one year, fined the organization $3,000 plus the cost of damages to the stolen items, and punished the members involved with probation or suspension.

In 2003, an unsuccessful illegal break-in was attempted by two unidentified males.

See also
 Dartmouth College student groups
 List of collegiate secret societies
 National Register of Historic Places listings in Grafton County, New Hampshire

References

External links
 Secret Societies: 360 will be invited to join--will you be one?
  Halls, Tombs and Houses: Student Society Architecture at Dartmouth

Dartmouth College student organizations
Collegiate secret societies
Student societies in the United States
Student organizations established in 1885
National Register of Historic Places in Grafton County, New Hampshire
Clubhouses on the National Register of Historic Places in New Hampshire
Secret societies in the United States
1885 establishments in New Hampshire